Axiom is a board game published in 1988 by Seventh Seal.

Contents
Axiom is a game in which two players move pieces (called sceptres) into a positional relationship with one of the pieces of their opponent.

Reception
Eric Solomon reviewed Axiom for Games International magazine, and gave it 3 stars out of 5, and stated that "although I love abstract games and original abstract games in particular, I am not captivated by Axiom. However, there is no doubt that someone who played it regularly would discover subtleties which have escaped me."

References

Board games introduced in 1988